Eskimo Day is a 1996 BBC comedy drama, written by Jack Rosenthal and directed by Piers Haggard, about the trials and tribulations of three young would-be students as they arrive with their families at Queens' College, Cambridge, on interview day. There was a sequel, Cold Enough for Snow, in 1997.

This film was Alec Guinness' final acting performance before his death in 2000.

Cast 
Maureen Lipman as Shani Whittle
David Ross as Bevis Whittle
Benedict Sandiford as Neil Whittle
Tom Wilkinson as Hugh Lloyd
Laura Howard as Pippa 'Muffin' Lloyd
Anna Carteret as Harriet Lloyd
Alec Guinness as James
James Fleet as Simon
Pippa Hinchley as Bobbie the waitress
Lila Kaye as Mother Polly

References

1996 television films
1996 films
BBC television dramas
British comedy television shows
Queens' College, Cambridge